Gossip from the Forest: the Tangled Roots of our Forests and Fairytales is a 2012 book by Sara Maitland about the connections between forests and fairytales in Northern Europe. It is structured around accounts of walks through 12 forests in Scotland and England, one per month of the year, and 12 associated retellings of traditional fairytales, and was published by Granta.

Maitland has described the book as "a hybrid book  ... history and photographs and nature and politics and science and anthropology and fiction (my own retellings of 12 Grimm stories) and, indeed, gossip."

The chapters: the forests and the retold tales

March
Airyolland Wood, Dumfries and Galloway 
"Thumbling"
April
Saltridge Wood, near Stroud, Gloucestershire  
"The White Snake"
May
The New Forest, Hampshire
"Rumpelstiltskin"
June
Epping Forest, Greater London and Essex
"Hansel and Gretel"
July
The Great North Wood, Dulwich, Sydenham and Norwood, London 
"Little Goosegirl"
August
Staverton Thicks (and Staverton Park), Suffolk  
"The Seven Swans' Sister" - see "The Six Swans"
September
Forest of Dean, Gloucestershire
"The Seven Dwarves"
October
Ballochbuie, near Braemar and the Forest of Mar, Aberdeenshire 
"Rapunzel"
November
Kielder Forest, Northumberland
"Little Red Riding Hood and the Big Bad Wolf"
December
 The Purgatory Wood, near New Luce, Dumfries and Galloway   
"The Four Comrades" - see "Town Musicians of Bremen"
January
Glenlee: woods at this house near New Galloway, Dumfries and Galloway 
"Dancing Shoes" - see "The Twelve Dancing Princesses"
February
Knockman Wood, Cree Valley, Galloway Hills  
"The Dreams of the Sleeping Beauty"

References

British non-fiction books
Works about fairy tales
Natural history books
Anthropology books
2012 non-fiction books
English non-fiction books
Books about cats
Dogs in literature
Granta Books books